Calliostoma fragum is a species of sea snail, a marine gastropod mollusk in the family Calliostomatidae.

Description
The height of the shell attains 8 mm.
The subperforate shell has a conical shape. It is pale purplish-brown, painted with whitish stripes, with 4 distant series of granules. The eight granulate whorls have their basal margins prominent. The interstices are very delicately obliquely striate. The base is a little convex, sculptured with 8 flat subgranose concentric lirae, each one divided by a furrow into two parts, alternating with narrow elevated lines. The smooth aperture is rhomboidal. The columella is a little oblique, and subtruncate at its base.

Distribution
This marine species occurs off the Philippines.

References

External links
 

fragum
Gastropods described in 1848
Taxa named by Rodolfo Amando Philippi